This is the discography of Celldweller, an American electronic rock project created by multi-instrumentalist artist Klayton.

Celldweller often releases his primary studio albums in chapters/parts over a period of time. Wish Upon a Blackstar was released after 5 chapters, Soundtrack for the Voices in My Head Vol. 2 was released in 3 chapters and the latest releases Soundtrack for the Voices in My Head Vol. 03 and the Blackstar score are both currently on their first chapters.

Celldweller has also hosted numerous remix competitions on the FiXT website.

Albums

Studio albums

Scores

Remix albums

Live albums

Compilation albums

Extended plays

Singles

Remixes

Collaborations

DJ Mixes

Other material

Unreleased tracks
This section refers to any material not yet released as full, studio-quality tracks.

Music videos

References

Rock music group discographies
Discographies of American artists